William Armitstead may refer to:

 William Armistead (burgess) (died c. 1716), represented Elizabeth City, Virginia in the Virginia House of Burgesses
 William Armistead (1754–1793), slave owner and namesake of former slave and spy James Armistead Lafayette
 William Armistead (1762–1842), Revolutionary war veteran and Alabama pioneer
 William Martin Armistead (1873–1955), publicist for the N. W. Ayer & Son advertising agency
 William Martin Armistead House

See also
 William Armitstead (1833–1907), English cricketer